Brownlow Thomas Atlay (b 10 June 1832 Great Casterton; d. 16 September 1912 Ealing)  was Archdeacon of Calcutta from 1883 until 1888.

Atlay was educated at Uppingham School and St John's College, Cambridge and   ordained in 1857.  After  a curacy in Barrow, Suffolk he served with the Indian Ecclesiastical Establishment at Naini Tal before becoming Chaplain of St. Paul's Cathedral, Calcutta. On his return from India he was Vicar of Willesden until he retired in 1902.

He died on 16 September 1912. His older brother was James Atlay (1817 – 1894), Bishop of Hereford.

References

Alumni of St John's College, Cambridge
Archdeacons of Calcutta
1832 births
1912 deaths
People educated at Uppingham School
People from Great Casterton